Hylodes perere is a species of frog in the family Hylodidae. It is endemic to Brazil and only known from Serra Negra, a part of Mantiqueira Mountains, in Santa Bárbara do Monte Verde, Minas Gerais state. The specific name perere (from Portuguese pererê) is derived from a character in Indian folklore who guards the forest, disrupting its silence with its whistles—in reference to the vocalizations of this species.

Description
Males measure  and females  in snout–vent length. The snout is truncated in both dorsal and lateral views. The dorsum and dorsal portions of thighs are light olive-brown with dark blotches. There are dark stripes in the thighs.

Males are territorial and call in forest-covered stretches of streams, perched on rocks, branches, stream marginss, or partly submerged in the water. They both day and night; this is unusual as other Hylodes species call by daytime only.

Habitat

References

perere
Amphibians described in 2008
Amphibians of Brazil
Endemic fauna of Brazil